Khalid Bourdif is a retired Dutch-Moroccan kickboxer, throughout his career he has been ranked as one of the ten best light heavyweight in the world by Liver Kick.

He is the former two time Dutch Muay Thai National champion, the former 76 kg Klash and SLAMM!! Events Champion, as well as the 2009 Beast of the East Tournament Winner.

Biography and career
In 2009 Bourdif entered the eight man Beast of the East 72.5 kg tournament. In the quarterfinals he faced the two time K-1 MAX tournament winner José Reis. He won a unanimous decision. In the semi finals he scored a third-round TKO win over Dave Van Den Ploeg. In the finals he fought the It's Showtime and SuperLeague champion Alviar Lima. He won the fight by unanimous decision.

In May 2019, he fought and defeated Amir Zeyada. At the end of the year, during SLAMM "Nederland vs Thailand VI" he fought Yodsanklai Fairtex for the WMC World Middleweight title. He lost a unanimous decision.

In 2010 he fought and beat Ali Gunyar during New Generation Warriors 4, as well as Murthel Groenhart during Fightclub presents: It's Showtime 2010.

His last fight came in 2015, when he lost by TKO to Regian Eersel. Since his retirement, he has opened his own gym, the Bourdif Gym, with the aim of working with troubled youths. The municipality of Utrecht voted it the Best Sports Association for 2019.

Championships and accomplishments
Beast of the East
2009 Beast of the East 72.5 kg Tournament Winner
SLAMM!! Events
SLAMM!! 76 kg World Championship
KlasH
KlasH 76 kg World Championship

Kickboxing record

|-  bgcolor=
|-  bgcolor="#FFBBBB"
| 2015-04-19|| Loss||align=left|Regian Eersel || The Best of all Elements || Almere, Netherlands || TKO (Doctor Stoppage)|| 2 || 
|-  bgcolor="#cfc"
| 2014-02-22|| Win||align=left|Wiliam Diender || Enfusion Live - Sportmani Events V || Amsterdam, Netherlands || Decision (Unanimous) || 3 || 3:00
|-  bgcolor="#FFBBBB"
| 2011-03-12|| Loss||align=left|Marcus Oberg || Oktagon 2011: Petrosyan vs Cosmo || Milan, Italy || Decision (Unanimous) || 3 || 3:00
|-  bgcolor="#CCFFCC"
| 2010-12-18|| Win||align=left|Murthel Groenhart || Fightclub presents: It's Showtime 2010 || Amsterdam, Netherlands || Decision (Unanimous) || 3 || 3:00
|-  bgcolor="#CCFFCC"
| 2010-05-2|| Win||align=left|Ali Gunyar || New Generation Warriors 4 || Utrecht, Netherlands || Decision (Unanimous) || 3 || 3:00
|-  bgcolor="#FFBBBB"
| 2009-11-29|| Loss||align=left|Yodsanklai Fairtex || SLAMM "Nederland vs Thailand VI" || Almere, Netherlands || Decision (Unanimous) || 5 || 3:00
|-
! style=background:white colspan=9 |
|-  bgcolor="#CCFFCC"
| 2009-05-31|| Win||align=left|Amir Zeyada || Amsterdam Fight Club || Amsterdam, Netherlands || Decision (Unanimous) || 3 || 3:00
|-  bgcolor="#CCFFCC"
| 2009-01-24|| Win||align=left|Alviar Lima || Beast of the East, Final || Zutphen, Netherlands || Decision (Unanimous) || 3 || 3:00
|-
! style=background:white colspan=9 |
|-  bgcolor="#CCFFCC"
| 2009-01-24|| Win||align=left|Dave Van Den Ploeg || Beast of the East, Semi Final || Zutphen, Netherlands || TKO || 3 || 
|-  bgcolor="#CCFFCC"
| 2009-01-24|| Win||align=left|José Reis || Beast of the East, Quarter Final || Zutphen, Netherlands || Decision (Unanimous) || 3 || 3:00
|-  bgcolor="#CCFFCC"
| 2008-12-|| Win||align=left|Yucel Fidan ||  ||  Netherlands || Decision  || 5 || 3:00
|-  bgcolor="#c5d2ea"
| 2008-03-08 || Draw ||align=left|Kaoklai Kaennorsing || Fight Night in Düsseldorf || Düsseldorf, Germany || Decision || 5 || 3:00
|-  bgcolor="#c5d2ea"
| 2007-11-11 || Draw ||align=left|Halim El Issaoui || Enter The Dragon 5 || Arnhem, Netherlands || Decision || 5 || 3:00
|-  bgcolor="#CCFFCC"
| 2007-05-19|| Win||align=left|Lindo Profas|| Fight Sensation 2 || Doetinchem Netherlands || Decision  || 5 || 3:00
|-
| colspan=9 | Legend:

See also
 List of male kickboxers

References 

1981 births
Living people
Dutch male kickboxers
Moroccan male kickboxers
Welterweight kickboxers
Dutch Muay Thai practitioners
Moroccan Muay Thai practitioners